Archerfish is a remote-controlled underwater mine neutraliser that is manufactured by BAE Systems Maritime Services.  Archerfish uses sonar and video to find sea mines, then fires a warhead with a shaped charge to destroy them, reducing the need for human beings to enter minefields.

Service history 
Archerfish is currently in service with the US Navy.

References 

Minesweepers
Naval weapons of the United States
BAE Systems weapons systems